The Taurach Railway is a  narrow-gauge museum railway in the Austrian state of Salzburg.

History

The Taurach Railway uses the section of the Murtalbahn from Tamsweg to Mauterndorf, which was closed for economic reasons in 1981 after heavy damage to a bridge. The section was revived as a museum railway by Club 760, which is an association formed for that purpose. Club 760 leased the line on 1 April 1982 and from 1983 to 1987 volunteers and members worked on restoring it. The Taurachbahn was opened on 9 July 1988 and operates as a museum railway weekends every summer.

The route

The line begins at Mauterndorf station and runs along the  through  stop to Mariapfarr station. From there the route goes through Lintsching stop to St. Andrä Andlwirt, which is the terminus for passenger traffic. The Taurachbahn continues a further two kilometers to meet the Murtalbahn at Tamsweg. On this section is a branchline, which gives an easier grade. Tamsweg station is not used for regular tourist traffic because of the fees demanded by the Steiermärki National Railways for it; however special trains do go through to Mauterndorf through Tamsweg from the Murtalbahn on specific occasions. Also this section is used for the mutual change by vehicles.

Infrastructure

The major station on the railway is Mauterndorf, where there is a boiler house and workshop, and also a wagon-works constructed in 1999 with the assistance of a European Union grant. After  passing through Mariapfarr the line crosses the Taurach, and Lignitzbach rivers, and then local highway L248.  After St. Andrä-Andlwirt the railway crosses the Göriachbach river, local highway L222, and then finally the Lessachbach river.

The railway crossings on the federal highway at Mariapfarr station and the local highway at Lintsching stop are secured by barriers, which must be closed and opened by the train crew by hand. There are many crossings at local dirt roads, which are secured by speed limits, St Andrews crosses and/or stop boards.

Rolling stock
Steam locomotives 298,56, 699,01, StLB 6 are used to operate the railway, and in 2004 locomotive 12 from a salt mine railway was obtained. Diesel locomotives 2091,03 and SKGLB D40 are also used, as well as three smaller diesel locomotives and a hand trolley for work trips. Several historic railway carriages are used for passenger traffic. In the goods yard are a number of goods wagons, several of which are used for maintenance on the railway.

Operation

The railway operates on Saturday and Sunday afternoons from the middle of June to in the middle of September, in the mornings in July and August and on Friday afternoons from middle of July to the middle of August. The railway is operated completely by those voluntary members from Club 760.

References

 
 
 
 
 

760 mm gauge railways in Austria
Heritage railways in Austria
Railway companies of Austria
Museums in Salzburg (state)
Railway museums in Austria
Articles containing video clips